Canadian Forces Base Montreal (also CFB Montreal or "Longue-Pointe" to members of 34 Brigade) is a Canadian Forces Base network located in Montreal, Quebec. Its official name is 2nd Canadian Division Support Base Valcartier, Detachment Montreal The address of CFB Montreal is 6769 Notre-Dame Street.

History
In 1994, the Canadian Forces Bases (CFBs) in Montreal and Saint-Jean were merged to create a new entity, an expanded CFB Montreal that included the Longue-Pointe, Saint-Hubert (Saint-Hubert), CFB Saint-Jean, Farnham and Saint-Bruno sites. In 1998, the mergers culminated in the amalgamation of CFB Montreal and CFB Valcartier into a new organization, 5 Area Support Group (now 2nd Canadian Division Support Group).

Physical description

CFB Montreal is delimited by sectors north and south accessible from streets Notre-Dame Street and Hochelaga.
The north and south sectors of CFB Montreal occupy an area of  square.

Montreal CFB covers several sites: for example many armories welcome Primary Reserves to the site of Saint-Bruno or marine equipment trials in the LaSalle borough.

On the Saint-Hubert site, 190 housing are available to military staff.

The garrison is an important military base located in the heart of the Montreal.

Economic data
CFB Montreal employs approximately 2,000 people, military and civilians.
A lot of merchandise valued at several billion dollars are stored at CFB Montreal.
CFB Montreal is the hub of the Canadian Army.
Local spending impact : $200,598,000.
Estimated local spending impacts (direct and indirect) : $223,210,000.

Units, formation and reserves forces
The base itself is home to a number of units, formations of both the Regular and Reserve forces, including:

 202 Workshop Depot (Corps of Royal Canadian Electrical and Mechanical Engineers)
 25 CFSD (Canadian Forces Supply Depot)
 Army Equipment Fielding Centre
 2nd Canadian Division 
 Headquarters
 4 Intelligence Company
 34 Canadian Brigade Group (Reserve) Headquarters, responsible for local units including:
 The Royal Canadian Hussars (Montreal) (Reserve) (armoured)
 The Canadian Grenadier Guards (Reserve) (light infantry)
 The Black Watch (Royal Highland Regiment) of Canada (Reserve) (light infantry)
 The Royal Montreal Regiment (Reserve) (light infantry)
 Le Régiment de Maisonneuve (Reserve) (light infantry)
 Les Fusiliers Mont-Royal (Reserve) (light infantry)
 34 Combat Engineer Regiment (Reserve) (Engineers)
 5 MP Regiment detachment
 Joint Task Force East

The CFB Montreal newspaper
The Journal Servir is the official newspaper of CFB Montreal. It covers the military community west of Quebec (CFB Montreal and CFB Saint-Jean). Every second Wednesday, some 3,300 copies are distributed free of charge to CFB Montreal, Saint-Jean and elsewhere in the region covered.

Building 42
Building 42, also called the Administration Building, is on the Canadian Register of Historic Places. The one-storey building faces Notre-Dame Street and was constructed in 1941.

References

External links 
 CFB Montreal CFB Presentation — Canadian Forces Newspaper
CFB Montreal Servir newspapers — CFB Montreal official newspapers
CFB Montreal - Canadian Armed Forces

Montreal
Mercier–Hochelaga-Maisonneuve